The 2012–13 South Pacific cyclone season was a below average tropical cyclone season, with five tropical cyclones occurring within the basin between 160°E and 120°W. The season officially ran from November 1, 2012, to April 30, 2013, however the last tropical disturbance was last noted on May 1, as it moved into the subtropics. During the season, tropical cyclones were officially monitored by the Fiji Meteorological Service (FMS), Australian Bureau of Meteorology (BoM) and New Zealand's MetService. The United States Joint Typhoon Warning Center (JTWC) and other national meteorological services including Météo-France and NOAA also monitored the basin during the season. During the season there were 22 significant tropical disturbances assigned a number and a F suffix by the FMS's Regional Specialized Meteorological Center in Nadi, Fiji (RSMC Nadi), including Severe Tropical Cyclone Sandra which moved into the basin from the Australian region on March 9. The BoM, MetService and RSMC Nadi all estimated sustained wind speeds over a period of 10-minutes and used the Australian tropical cyclone intensity scale, while the JTWC estimated sustained winds over a 1-minute period, which are subsequently compared to the Saffir–Simpson hurricane wind scale (SSHS).



Seasonal forecasts

Ahead of the cyclone season, RSMC Nadi, TCWC Wellington, the Australian Bureau of Meteorology (BoM), the New Zealand National Institute of Water and Atmospheric Research (NIWA) and various other Pacific Meteorological services, all contributed towards the Island Climate Update tropical cyclone outlook that was released during October 2012. The outlook took into account the ENSO  neutral conditions and near normal sea surface temperature anomalies that had been observed across the Pacific. As a result, the outlook called for a near average number of tropical cyclones for the 2012–13 season, with nine to twelve named tropical cyclones predicted to occur between 135°E and 120°W compared to an average of 10. At least two of the tropical cyclones were expected to become category 3 severe tropical cyclones, while one might intensify into a category 4 severe tropical cyclone. The outlook also noted within past analogues, category 5 severe tropical cyclones had not been prominent for ENSO neutral seasons, but the most recent analogue suggested that this type of event was possible.

In addition to contributing towards the outlook, RSMC Nadi and the BoM issued their own seasonal forecasts for the South Pacific region. The BoM issued 3 seasonal forecasts for the South Pacific region between 142.5°E and 120°W, one for the Western Southern Pacific region between 142.5°E and 165°E and one for the Eastern Southern Pacific region between 165°E and 120°W. They noted that the current neutral ENSO conditions would historically suggest the South Pacific region as a whole would experience near average tropical cyclone activity during the coming season. However, because of the warmer than average sea surface temperatures that were experienced in the central equatorial Pacific between July — September 2012, the western Southern Pacific had a 65% chance for average to below average tropical cyclone activity. For the Eastern part of the region, the BoM predicted that it had a 55% chance of above average tropical cyclones, while for the overall region, they predicted that the region would experience a near average amount of tropical cyclones with a 53% chance of having an above average number of tropical cyclones. Within their outlook RSMC Nadi predicted that between seven and ten tropical cyclones, would occur within the basin compared to an average of around 7.4 cyclones. At least four of the tropical cyclones were expected to become category 3 severe tropical cyclones, while two-three might intensify into a category 4 or 5 severe tropical cyclones. They also reported that the tropical cyclone genesis trough was expected to be located near the International Date Line. This was based on the ENSO Neutral conditions, and the existence of the warm pool of sea surface and sub surface temperature anomalies near the dateline.

Risk forecasts
Both the Island Climate Update and RSMC Nadi's tropical cyclone outlooks assessed the risk of a tropical cyclone affecting a certain island or territory. As the tropical cyclone genesis trough of low pressure was expected to be located near the Dateline, normal or above normal activity was expected for areas near the dateline. The Island Climate Update Outlook predicted that most of the countries to the west of the International Date Line, including Papua New Guinea, the Solomon Islands, Vanuatu, New Caledonia Tonga and Fiji were expected to experience near normal or slightly above normal activity. At least one or more severe tropical cyclones were expected to occur anywhere across the southwest Pacific during the season. RSMC Nadi's outlook predicted that New Caledonia, Southern Tonga, Tokelau, Tuvalu, Solomon Islands, Fiji and Vanuatu had an average risk of being affected by a tropical cyclone. Wallis and Futuna, Samoa, Northern Tonga, Niue, Cook Islands and French Polynesia were predicted to face an above average chance of being affected by a tropical cyclone. RSMC Nadi also predicted that there was a potential risk in the chances of severe tropical cyclones, affecting the region this year when compared to the previous season. There was a high chance of Tokelau being affected by a tropical cyclone while there was a moderate to high risk for severe tropical cyclones to affect New Caledonia, the Cook Islands, the Samoan Islands and the Solomon Islands. Wallis and Futuna, Tuvalu, Niue and Vanuatu were predicted to have a moderate risk while Fiji and Tonga were thought to have a low to moderate risk of being impacted by a severe tropical cyclone.

Seasonal summary

The first tropical disturbance of the season developed on November 6, to the southwest of Suva, Fiji which moved towards the southeast over the next day before it was last noted during the next day as it moved out of the tropics. Tropical Disturbance 02F subsequently developed on November 18 to the northeast of Port Vila, Vanuatu and over the next few days slowly moved to the west-southwest while gradually developing further. The system almost developed into a weak tropical cyclone as it moved along the Vanuatu Islands causing some locally heavy rain, minor damage and flash flooding, before it was last noted November 24 as it moved out of RSMC Nadi's area of responsibility. After 02F left the tropics, the basin remained quiet until early December when the Australian monsoon pushed eastwards along the South Pacific convergence zone, and a Madden–Julian oscillation caused an increase in tropical cyclone activity. On December 9, RSMC Nadi started to monitor the precursor systems to Tropical Depression 03F and Severe Tropical Cyclone Evan.

Systems

Tropical Depression 02F

Tropical Disturbance 02F developed within a trough of low pressure to the north-east of the Santa Cruz Islands during November 18. Over the next few days the system moved slowly and gradually developed further in an area of low vertical wind shear and was declared a tropical depression during November 20. The system subsequently turned towards the south-southeast and impacted Vanuatu, before it moved into an area of unfavourable conditions for further development, including high vertical wind shear and lower sea surface temperatures during November 22. As a result, convection surrounding the system significantly decreased and detached from the systems low level circulation center. The system was subsequently last noted by the FMS during November 24, as it approached the subtropics as a former tropical depression. There was no damage recorded when the depression impacted Vanuatu between November 20–22.

Tropical Depression 03F

It was classified as a Subtropical system by the SSHWS as it reached peak intensity on December 13 but failed to be a tropical cyclone. 03F then dissipated on December 17 near a subtropical ridge.

Severe Tropical Cyclone Evan

Over the next two days, the depression gradually developed further in an area of low vertical windshear and favourable sea surface temperatures, as it was steered eastwards by an upper level ridge of high pressure. During December 11, the JTWC started to issue warnings and designated the system as Tropical Cyclone 04P, after 1-minute sustained winds had become equivalent to a tropical storm.

Most of the roads out of Apia have reportedly been cut off by floodwaters. The system is expected to head south towards Fiji. It then weakened to a Tropical Depression on October 19 as its remnants became exposed. Its remnants continued to move southerly direction which gave heavy rains and strong winds to New Zealand on December 21 and 22 and fully dissipated on late on December 23.

Evan killed at least 14 people on Samoa and left behind severe damage. The US Ambassador to New Zealand and Samoa David Huebner confirmed the United States had provided NZ$ 60,000 to the Samoan Red Cross for relief operations. New Zealand authorities sent NZ$ 50,000 on December 15, as well as the P-3 Orion plane to search for the missing fishermen. Two days later the New Zealand Foreign Affairs Minister Murray McCully announced an additional NZ$ 550,000 was to be made available to the Samoan government, as well as the Samoan Red Cross and any agencies on the ground that might need it. Five additional New Zealand Red Cross workers were also sent to support local efforts. As the legislators prepared to receive initial assessments of the economic damage wrecked by Evan, the bill was expected to be at least NZ$ 200,000,000, and possibly rise as high as 300 million.

Severe Tropical Cyclone Freda

On December 26, RSMC Nadi reported that Tropical Disturbance 05F had developed within an area of low to moderate vertical windshear about 1075 km (670 mi) to the north of Port Vila, Vanuatu. During that day as the system moved towards the west, convection surrounding the centre and the general organization of the system increased, before RSMC Nadi reported that the system had developed into a tropical depression. During December 27, the depression started to move towards the southwest and the southern Solomon Islands, as convection surrounding the centre and the general organization of the system continued to increase. The system then passed near the Southern Solomon Islands early the next day, before the JTWC designated the depression as Tropical Cyclone 06P and initiated advisories on it as the system had become equivalent to a tropical storm. Later that day RSMC Nadi reported that the depression had become a category one tropical cyclone and named it Freda, as it continued to move towards the southwest and passed over Rennell Island. During December 29, Freda continued to move towards the south-southwest, crossed 160°E and briefly moved into the Australian region, before it started to move towards the south-southeast along the western edge of the subtropical ridge of high pressure and moved back into the South Pacific basin.

After it had peaked, Freda started to quickly weaken as it continued to move towards the south-southeast, as vertical windshear over the system increased and caused convection over Freda's northern semicircle to gradually wear away. By 0000 UTC on January 1, the JTWC reported that Freda had become equivalent to a category one hurricane, while RSMC Nadi had reported that the system had weakened into a category 2 tropical cyclone. Throughout that day, Freda continued to weaken before at 1800 UTC after deep convection had become displaced to the east of the low level circulation center, RSMC Nadi reported that the cyclone had weakened into a tropical depression. During the next day the JTWC issued their final advisory on the system after the low level circulation center had become fully exposed before the remnant tropical depression crossed the northern part of New Caledonia's Grande Terre Island. After crossing New Caledonia's biggest island, Freda started to move towards the southeast between Grande Terre and the Loyalty Islands, while the JTWC reported that Freda had become a subtropical cyclone, as it was positioned under a strong subtropical westerly flow.

As of December 29, the storm has hit the Solomon Islands with strong winds and heavy rain. The cyclone was full force on Rennell Island and the country's major island of Makira, which so far was the hardest hit. Winds of up to 130 kilometres per hour were expected in Rennell and Bellona Islands. Freda is expected to affect the country until early Monday morning.
On December 30, New Caledonia was being warned to prepare for the arrival of Freda on January 2. The category four system was weakening as it headed south-south east at about 13 kilometres per hour. On December 30, Freda moved across the southern Solomon Islands.
As Cyclone Freda weakened, it struck New Caledonia as a tropical storm at about 0000 UTC on January 2, 2013.

At the height of the storm one man drowned in New Caledonia, while another person was left missing after attempting to cross a swollen river while around 3200 people were without power.

Tropical Depression 08F

Severe Tropical Cyclone Garry

Tropical Cyclone Garry was forecast to intensify as a Category 1 with 1-min sustained winds of 65 knots briefly according to the JTWC. However, it intensified to a Category 2 with 1-min sustained winds of 85 knots according to the JTWC.

Tropical Depression 11F

Tropical Cyclone Haley

A few days later, it strengthened to Tropical Cyclone Haley. On February 11, RSMC Nadi issues its final advisory for ex-Tropical Cyclone Haley having agreed that it would move South-East and weaken further.
By February 11, Haley weakened into a tropical depression, with the low level circulation center becoming fully exposed, with most of the convection displaced to the far east due to wind shear from the west, overall decreasing its organization.

Tropical Disturbance 16F

The system resulted in gale warnings being issued in Tonga.

Severe Tropical Cyclone Sandra

Cyclone Sandra formed off the Queensland coast on March 8.

Upon reaching Category 4 and threatening New Caledonia, it hit Lord Howe Island as a Category 2 storm on March 15, despite weakening to Category 1 the day before. The remnants of Sandra bought areas of heavy rain and thunderstorms to drought-stricken parts of New Zealand, with reports of up to 112 mm at Turakina near Whanganui and a tornado in New Plymouth.

High waves caused by the cyclone caused the death of one man at Bondi beach in Australia.

Other systems
The following weak tropical disturbances and depressions were also monitored by RSMC Nadi, however all of these systems were either short lived or did not develop significantly. The first tropical disturbance of the season developed on November 6, to the southwest of Suva, Fiji. The system subsequently moved towards the southeast over the next day, before it was last noted during November 7, as it moved out of the tropics. During the next day, the system slowly moved southwards and developed into a tropical depression, before it was last noted later that day as it moved out of the tropics. Over the next two days the disturbance moved towards the southeast, before it was last noted during January 9, as it was not expected to become a tropical cyclone and convection surrounding the system had become irregular.

Over the next couple of days the system slowly moved south-eastwards, before the disturbance was last noted by RSMC Nadi on January 28. During that day, convection surrounding the system became displaced to the east of the low level circulation center before the final warning was issued later that day. By February 7, the system's low level circulation center became exposed, with RSMC Nadi issuing their final warning on the system as it had left the tropics.

Over the next couple of days the system moved slowly westwards and impacted Fiji, with heavy rain and squally thunderstorms which led to localised flooding being reported in various places on Viti Levu. The system was subsequently last noted during February 24, as it turned and started to move south-eastwards.

Over the next few days the system moved towards the southwest as deep convection surrounding the system decreased, before the system was last noted during March 15. Over the next few days, the system moved towards the southwest and affected the Northern islands of Vanuatu, before the disturbance was last noted during March 17. Tropical Disturbance 20F developed on March 27, about  NW of Fiji.

Over the next couple of days convection surrounding the system remained poor, as it moved south-eastwards into an area of high vertical windshear. The system was last noted on May 1, to the south of Fiji as it moved into TCWC Wellington's area of responsibility.

Season effects
This table lists all the storms that developed in the South Pacific to the east of longitude 160°E during the 2012–2013 season. It includes their intensity on the Australian tropical cyclone intensity scale, duration, name, landfalls, deaths, and damages. All data is taken from RSMC Nadi and/or TCWC Wellington, and all of the damage figures are in 2012 USD.

|-
|  ||  || bgcolor=#| || bgcolor=#| || bgcolor=#| || Fiji || None || None ||
|-
|  ||  || bgcolor=#| || bgcolor=#| || bgcolor=#| || Solomon Islands, Vanuatu, Fiji || None || None ||
|-
|  ||  || bgcolor=#| || bgcolor=#| || bgcolor=#| || Cook Islands || None || 1 ||
|-
|  ||  || bgcolor=#| || bgcolor=#| || bgcolor=#| || Samoan Islands, Wallis and Futuna, FijiTonga, New Zealand ||  || 14 ||
|-
|  ||  || bgcolor=#| || bgcolor=#| || bgcolor=#| || Solomon Islands, New Caledonia || Unknown ||  ||
|-
|  ||  || bgcolor=#| || bgcolor=#| || bgcolor=#| || None || None || None ||
|-
|  ||  || bgcolor=#| || bgcolor=#| || bgcolor=#| || French Polynesia || None || None ||
|-
|  ||  || bgcolor=#| || bgcolor=#| || bgcolor=#| || Wallis and Futuna, Fiji, Tonga || None || None ||
|-
|  ||  || bgcolor=#| || bgcolor=#| || bgcolor=#| || Tokelau, Wallis and FutunaSamoan Islands, Cook Islands || Minor || None ||
|-
|  ||  || bgcolor=#| || bgcolor=#| || bgcolor=#| || Solomon Islands || None || None ||
|-
|  ||  || bgcolor=#| || bgcolor=#| || bgcolor=#| || None || None || None ||
|-
|  ||  || bgcolor=#| || bgcolor=#| || bgcolor=#| || French Polynesia || None || None ||
|-
|  ||  || bgcolor=#| || bgcolor=#| || bgcolor=#| || Cook Islands || None || None ||
|-
|  ||  || bgcolor=#| || bgcolor=#| || bgcolor=#| || Cook Islands || None || None ||
|-
|  ||  || bgcolor=#| || bgcolor=#| || bgcolor=#| || Fiji || None || None ||
|-
|  ||  || bgcolor=#| || bgcolor=#| || bgcolor=#| || New Caledonia, Vanuatu, Fiji || None || None ||
|-
|  ||  || bgcolor=#| || bgcolor=#| || bgcolor=#| || New Caledonia, New Zealand || None || None ||
|-
|  ||  || bgcolor=#| || bgcolor=#| || bgcolor=#| || Fiji || None || None ||
|-
|  ||  || bgcolor=#| || bgcolor=#| || bgcolor=#| || Vanuatu || None || None ||
|-
|  ||  || bgcolor=#| || bgcolor=#| || bgcolor=#| || None || None || None ||
|-
|  ||  || bgcolor=#| || bgcolor=#| || bgcolor=#| || None || None || None ||
|-
|  ||  || bgcolor=#| || bgcolor=#| || bgcolor=#| || None || None || None ||
|-

See also

 Tropical cyclones in 2012 and 2013
List of South Pacific cyclone seasons
Atlantic hurricane seasons: 2012, 2013
Pacific hurricane seasons: 2012, 2013
Pacific typhoon seasons: 2012, 2013
North Indian Ocean cyclone seasons: 2012, 2013
2012–13 South-West Indian Ocean cyclone season
2012–13 Australian region cyclone season

References

External links

 
South Pacific cyclone seasons
Articles which contain graphical timelines
2012 SPac
2013 SPac